Maggie Gee may refer to:

 Maggie Gee (novelist) (born 1948), English novelist
 Maggie Gee (pilot) (1923–2013), American aviator